is a 1968 Japanese tokusatsu science fiction horror film directed by Kazui Nihonmatsu.

Cast

Production
Genocide was co-written by Susumu Takaku, an anime and live-action screenwriter. The films staff includes Shizuo Hirase as the cinematographer who also worked on the Shochiku films The X from Outer Space and Goké, Body Snatcher from Hell.

Release
Genocide was released in Japan on 9 November 1968. It was released as a double feature with The Living Skeleton. The film was released in the United States by Shochiku Films of America in 1969. The film was promoted under the title War of the Insects on this release.

The Criterion Collection released Genocide on DVD in a compilation set titled When Horror Came to Shochiku through their Eclipse label. The box set was released on November 20, 2012.

Reception
Slant Magazine described the film as "appropriately harrowing" and one where women "come under the most direct indictment".  The review opined that Nihonmatsu "handles with considerably more skill than his prior Shochiku effort" and that "Genre films don't often cover as much ground stylistically or thematically as Genocide, let alone get more bleak (the film ultimately hinges on the potential detonation of a hydrogen bomb and the single mother who may have to single-handedly repopulate a country), but as the last horror film Shochiku would produce, it's suitably ambitious and apocalyptic in its finality." Sight & Sound described Genocide as an "accident of a film" that "plays mostly as a national symptom, in a legacy of scenarios devised both to make sense of, and to reduce to pulp the memories of nuclear heat-death".

See also
 List of horror films of 1968
 List of Japanese films of 1968
 List of science fiction films of the 1960s

References

Footnotes

Sources

External links
 

1968 films
1968 horror films
1960s science fiction horror films
1960s Japanese-language films
Japanese science fiction horror films
Shochiku films
Films scored by Shunsuke Kikuchi
Films about insects
Films set on airplanes
African-American horror films
Mad scientist films
1960s American films
1960s Japanese films